DFW Tornados (also known as Dallas–Fort Worth Tornados) was an American soccer team based in Dallas, Texas, United States. Founded in 1986, the team played in the USL Premier Development League (PDL), the fourth tier of the American Soccer Pyramid, in the Mid South Division of the Southern Conference. The franchise folded at the end of the 2010 season and left the league thereafter.

The team played its home games at Pizza Hut Park (the home of Major League Soccer's FC Dallas) in nearby Frisco, Texas. The team's colors were black, blue and white.

History

In 1986, the club, known as Garland Genesis, based in Garland, Texas, became a founding member of the Southwest Indoor Soccer League.  The team topped the standings during the 1986-1987 season before defeating the Lubbock Lazers in the championship game.  The team moved to Addison, Texas in 1987 and changed their name to the Addison Arrows.  They remained in Addison for two years.  In 1989, the league added a summer outdoor season and Addison promptly went to the championship game, this time losing to the Colorado Comets.  In 1989, owner Ken Mulhall sold the team.  At the time, he also coached the Arrows.  The new owner fired Mulhall as coach and named Billy Pettigrew as head coach.  The team continued its excellent play during the 1989-1990 indoor season, defeating the Phoenix Hearts to take their second indoor championship.  Following the completion of the indoor season, the team moved to the Dallas/Fort Worth are and was renamed North Texas United.  In November 1990, they merged with the Waco Kickers and became the Fort Worth Kickers.  After team owner Pat Parker was unable to gain financial backing for the team, it moved to Dallas and became the Dallas Kickers for the 1991/92 indoor season.  The team was renamed the Dallas Americans before the 1992 outdoor season. They were renamed the Dallas/Fort Worth Toros in 1993, and remained as such until 1996, when they were renamed the Dallas Toros for the 1997 outdoor season. They became the Texas Toros in 1998, and the Texas Rattlers for the 2000 season. Upon their move to the Premier Development League for 2001 they changed their name, and were bought by the Texas Spurs, which they maintained until 2003, when the Spurs club sold the team to the owner of Arena Athletics in Euless, Texas. They finally took their current name, the DFW Tornados, beginning in 2004.

Players

Final roster
This list is a historical record of the final group of players on the last Tornados roster for their final game in August 2010. Source:

Notable former players

This list of notable former players comprises players who went on to play professional soccer after playing for the team in the Premier Development League, or those who previously played professionally before joining the team.

  Kyle Altman
  Cody Bragg
  Kyle Brown
  Jeff Agoos
  John Hedlund
  Caesar Cervin
  Andres Cuero
  Chad Deering
  Aaron DeLoach
  Hunter Freeman
  Bruno Guarda
  Stephen McCarthy
  Ryan Mirsky
  Jordan Murch
  Jay Needham
  Gifton Noel-Williams
  Dane Saintus
  Shea Salinas
  Chad Smith
  T. J. Tomasso
  Jamie Watson
  Daniel Woolard

Year-by-year

New indoor team (2004-2012) 
DFW Tornados played in the Premier Arena Soccer League in the South Central Division. The team played its home games at Arena Athletics in Euless, TX.

Honors
 USL PDL Mid South Division Champions 2001
 USL D-3 Pro League Southern Division Champions 2000
 USISL Pro League Central Division Champions 1996

Head coaches
  Ken Muhall (1986-1989)
  Ken Billy Pettigrew (1989-1990)
  Caesar Cervin (1991)
  Ed Puskarich (1998, 2001–2003)
  Bernard Brodigan (2004)
  Paul Robinson (2005–2010)

Stadia
 Pennington Field; Bedford, Texas (2004–2010)
 Pizza Hut Park; Frisco, Texas (2010)

Average attendance
Attendance stats are calculated by averaging each team's self-reported home attendances from the historical match archive at 

 2005: 207
 2006: 349
 2007: 389
 2008: 320
 2009: 188
 2010: 179

References

External links

Official Site
Official PDL site

 
USL League Two teams
Sports in the Dallas–Fort Worth metroplex
Soccer clubs in Dallas
Indoor soccer clubs in the United States
Association football clubs established in 1986
Association football clubs disestablished in 2010
1986 establishments in Texas
2010 disestablishments in Texas
Defunct soccer clubs in Texas